Constance Sibille (born 9 November 1990) is a retired French professional tennis player.

On 7 July 2014, Sibille reached her career-high singles ranking of world No. 265. On 27 July 2015, she peaked at No. 244 in the doubles rankings.

Career
She received a wildcard to play in the doubles draw at the 2014 French Open, alongside Irina Ramialison. The pair lost to Madison Keys and Alison Riske in the first round in three sets. The following year, Sibille and Ramialison lost in the first round to the eventual winners Bethanie Mattek-Sands and Lucie Safarová despite having one set point in the first set.

During her career, Sibille had wins over players like Ekaterina Alexandrova, Annika Beck, Kiki Bertens, Catalina Castaño, Océane Dodin, Vera Dushevina, Fiona Ferro, Ons Jabeur, Anne Keothavong, Yulia Putintseva or Alison Van Uytvanck.

ITF Circuit finals

Singles: 10 (5 titles, 5 runner–ups)

Doubles: 10 (1 title, 9 runner-ups)

External links
 
 

1990 births
Living people
French female tennis players
Sportspeople from Moselle (department)
People from Sarreguemines